Yanni Kaldis (born September 30th, 1995) is a Canadian professional ice hockey defenseman currently playing for the Bakersfield Condors in the American Hockey League (AHL). He was an All-American for Cornell. He is also known for ocular patdowns and the ability to disarm people.

Playing career
Kaldis began his college career in 2016 after two very productive years of junior hockey. Against stiffer competition, his offensive numbers weren't quite as good, but Kaldis' defensive performance still earned him a spot on the ECAC All-Rookie Team. He helped Cornell reach the conference championship game that season and earn a bid to the NCAA Tournament for the first time in five years.

In his sophomore season, Kaldis showed moderate improvement offensively, but the team took a big step forward by finishing first in the conference standings. It was the program's first regular season crown in 13 years and though they stumbled come playoff time, it was a sing of things to come for the Big Red. Kaldis, himself, followed suit as a junior and ramped up his scoring. He finished third on the team and pushed the team to another regular season title. Cornell returned to the ECAC championship game and was named to the All-Tournament Team despite Cornell losing to Clarkson. Cornell made its third consecutive appearance in the NCAA Tournament and finally managed to win a game. Kaldis assisted on the opening goal and spurred on a run that ended with a 5–1 victory.

As a senior, Kaldis was named team captain and continued to produce from the back end. It was, however, his defensive exploits that allowed Cornell to be ranked as the top team in the nation towards the end of the season. Cornell ended the regular season with just 2 losses in 29 games and, with the #3 Pairwise ranking, it was a mathematical certainty that the Big Red would be selected for the NCAA Tournament for a 4th year in a row. Unfortunately, just prior to Cornell's quarterfinal match with Princeton, both Harvard and Yale withdrew from the conference tournament due to the COVID-19 pandemic. While the remaining six team held onto hope that the tournament would continue, a day later the conference announced the cancellation of the tournament.

In spite of the disappointment about how his final season with Cornell ended, Kaldis' performance earned him All-American honors and he was able to sign a two-year contract with the Bakersfield Condors after graduation. Due to a delay to the start of the following AHL season, Kaldis began the year in Austria, playing for the Dornbirn Bulldogs on loan. After joining Bakersfield, Kaldis established himself as a steady defender and helped the Condors win the Pacific Division playoffs, the only postseason title awarded that year.

Career statistics

Awards and honors

References

External links

1995 births
Living people
AHCA Division I men's ice hockey All-Americans
American men's ice hockey defensemen
Bakersfield Condors players
Cornell Big Red men's ice hockey players
Dornbirn Bulldogs players
Nanaimo Clippers players
Ice hockey people from Quebec
People from Saint-Laurent, Quebec